Montaric Brown (born August 24, 1999) is an American football cornerback for the Jacksonville Jaguars of the National Football League (NFL). He played college football at Arkansas.

Professional career
Brown was drafted with the 222nd pick in the seventh round of the 2022 NFL Draft.

Career Stats

References

External links
Jacksonville Jaguars bio
 Arkansas Razorbacks bio

1999 births
Living people
People from Little River County, Arkansas
Players of American football from Arkansas
American football cornerbacks
Arkansas Razorbacks football players
Jacksonville Jaguars players